A greenhouse gas (GHG or GhG) is a gas that absorbs and emits radiant energy within the thermal infrared range, causing the greenhouse effect. The primary greenhouse gases in Earth's atmosphere are water vapor, carbon dioxide, methane, nitrous oxide, and ozone. The atmospheres of Venus, Mars and Titan also contain greenhouse gases.

Human activities since the beginning of the Industrial Revolution (around 1750) have increased the atmospheric concentration of carbon dioxide by over 50%, from 280 ppm in 1750 to 421 ppm in 2022. The last time the atmospheric concentration of carbon dioxide was this high was over 3 million years ago. This increase has occurred despite the absorption of more than half of the emissions by various natural carbon sinks in the carbon cycle.

At current greenhouse gas emission rates, temperatures could increase by 2 °C (3.6 °F), which the United Nations' Intergovernmental Panel on Climate Change (IPCC) says is the upper limit to avoid "dangerous" levels, by 2050. The vast majority of anthropogenic carbon dioxide emissions come from combustion of fossil fuels, principally coal, petroleum (including oil) and natural gas, with additional contributions from cement manufacturing, fertilizer production, deforestation and other changes in land use.

Constituents

Hence they are almost totally unaffected by infrared (IR) radiation. Their IR interaction by way of collision-induced absorption is also small compared to the influences of Earth's major greenhouse gases.

Greenhouse gases are those that absorb and emit infrared radiation in the wavelength range emitted by Earth. Carbon dioxide (0.04%), nitrous oxide, methane, and ozone are trace gases that account for almost 0.1% of Earth's atmosphere and have an appreciable greenhouse effect.

The most abundant greenhouse gases in Earth's atmosphere, listed in decreasing order of average global mole fraction, are:

 Water vapor
 Carbon dioxide
 Methane
 Nitrous oxide
 Ozone
 Chlorofluorocarbons (CFCs and HCFCs)
 Hydrofluorocarbons (HFCs)
 Perfluorocarbons (etc.), and 

Atmospheric concentrations are determined by the balance between sources (emissions of the gas from human activities and natural systems) and sinks (the removal of the gas from the atmosphere by conversion to a different chemical compound or absorption by bodies of water). The proportion of an emission remaining in the atmosphere after a specified time is the "airborne fraction" (AF). The annual airborne fraction is the ratio of the atmospheric increase in a given year to that year's total emissions. As of 2006 the annual airborne fraction for CO2 was about 0.45. The annual airborne fraction increased at a rate of 0.25 ± 0.21% per year over the period 1959–2006.

Indirect radiative effects

Oxidation of CO to  directly produces an unambiguous increase in radiative forcing although the reason is subtle. On the other hand, the single CO vibrational band only absorbs IR at much shorter wavelengths (4.7 microns, or 2145 cm−1), where the emission of radiant energy from Earth's surface is at least a factor of ten lower. In any case, the calculation of the total radiative effect includes both direct and indirect forcing.

A second type of indirect effect happens when chemical reactions in the atmosphere involving these gases change the concentrations of greenhouse gases. For example, the destruction of non-methane volatile organic compounds (NMVOCs) in the atmosphere can produce ozone. The size of the indirect effect can depend strongly on where and when the gas is emitted.

Methane has indirect effects in addition to forming . The main chemical that reacts with methane in the atmosphere is the hydroxyl radical (OH), thus more methane means that the concentration of OH goes down. Effectively, methane increases its own atmospheric lifetime and therefore its overall radiative effect. The oxidation of methane can produce both ozone and water; and is a major source of water vapor in the normally dry stratosphere. CO and NMVOCs produce  when they are oxidized. They remove OH from the atmosphere, and this leads to higher concentrations of methane. The same process that converts NMVOCs to carbon dioxide can also lead to the formation of tropospheric ozone. Halocarbons have an indirect effect because they destroy stratospheric ozone. Finally, hydrogen can lead to ozone production and  increases as well as producing stratospheric water vapor.

Role of water vapor

Water vapor accounts for the largest percentage of the greenhouse effect, between 36% and 66% for clear sky conditions and between 66% and 85% when including clouds. Water vapor concentrations fluctuate regionally, but human activity does not directly affect water vapor concentrations except at local scales, such as near irrigated fields. Indirectly, human activity that increases global temperatures will increase water vapor concentrations, a process known as water vapor feedback. The atmospheric concentration of vapor is highly variable and depends largely on temperature, from less than 0.01% in extremely cold regions up to 3% by mass in saturated air at about 32 °C. (See Relative humidity#Other important facts.)

Water vapor responds to and amplifies effects of the other greenhouse gases. The Clausius–Clapeyron relation establishes that more water vapor will be present per unit volume at elevated temperatures. This and other basic principles indicate that warming associated with increased concentrations of the other greenhouse gases also will increase the concentration of water vapor (assuming that the relative humidity remains approximately constant; modeling and observational studies find that this is indeed so). Because water vapor is a greenhouse gas, this results in further warming and so is a "positive feedback" that amplifies the original warming. Eventually other earth processes offset these positive feedbacks, stabilizing the global temperature at a new equilibrium and preventing the loss of Earth's water through a Venus-like runaway greenhouse effect.

Contribution of clouds to Earth's greenhouse effect
The major non-gas contributor to Earth's greenhouse effect, clouds, also absorb and emit infrared radiation and thus have an effect on greenhouse gas radiative properties. Clouds are water droplets or ice crystals suspended in the atmosphere.

Impacts on the overall greenhouse effect

The contribution of each gas to the greenhouse effect is determined by the characteristics of that gas, its abundance, and any indirect effects it may cause. For example, the direct radiative effect of a mass of methane is about 84 times stronger than the same mass of carbon dioxide over a 20-year time frame but it is present in much smaller concentrations so that its total direct radiative effect has so far been smaller, in part due to its shorter atmospheric lifetime in the absence of additional carbon sequestration. On the other hand, in addition to its direct radiative impact, methane has a large, indirect radiative effect because it contributes to ozone formation. Shindell et al. (2005) argues that the contribution to climate change from methane is at least double previous estimates as a result of this effect.

When ranked by their direct contribution to the greenhouse effect, the most important are:

In addition to the main greenhouse gases listed above, other greenhouse gases include sulfur hexafluoride, hydrofluorocarbons and perfluorocarbons (see IPCC list of greenhouse gases). Some greenhouse gases are not often listed. For example, nitrogen trifluoride has a high global warming potential (GWP) but is only present in very small quantities.

Proportion of direct effects at a given moment
It is not possible to state that a certain gas causes an exact percentage of the greenhouse effect. This is because some of the gases absorb and emit radiation at the same frequencies as others, so that the total greenhouse effect is not simply the sum of the influence of each gas. The higher ends of the ranges quoted are for each gas alone; the lower ends account for overlaps with the other gases. In addition, some gases, such as methane, are known to have large indirect effects that are still being quantified.

Atmospheric lifetime
Aside from water vapor, which has a residence time of about nine days, major greenhouse gases are well mixed and take many years to leave the atmosphere. Although it is not easy to know with precision how long it takes greenhouse gases to leave the atmosphere, there are estimates for the principal greenhouse gases.
Jacob (1999) defines the lifetime  of an atmospheric species X in a one-box model as the average time that a molecule of X remains in the box. Mathematically  can
be defined as the ratio of the mass  (in kg) of X in the box to its removal rate, which is the sum of the flow of X out of the box
(),
chemical loss of X
(),
and deposition of X
()
(all in kg/s):
.
If input of this gas into the box ceased, then after time , its concentration would decrease by about 63%.

The atmospheric lifetime of a species therefore measures the time required to restore equilibrium following a sudden increase or decrease in its concentration in the atmosphere. Individual atoms or molecules may be lost or deposited to sinks such as the soil, the oceans and other waters, or vegetation and other biological systems, reducing the excess to background concentrations. The average time taken to achieve this is the mean lifetime.

Carbon dioxide has a variable atmospheric lifetime, and cannot be specified precisely. Although more than half of the CO2 emitted is removed from the atmosphere within a century, some fraction (about 20%) of emitted CO2 remains in the atmosphere for many thousands to hundreds of thousands of years. Similar issues apply to other greenhouse gases, many of which have longer mean lifetimes than CO2, e.g. N2O has a mean atmospheric lifetime of 121 years.

Radiative forcing and annual greenhouse gas index

Earth absorbs some of the radiant energy received from the sun, reflects some of it as light and reflects or radiates the rest back to space as heat. A planet's surface temperature depends on this balance between incoming and outgoing energy. When Earth's energy balance is shifted, its surface becomes warmer or cooler, leading to a variety of changes in global climate.

A number of natural and man-made mechanisms can affect the global energy balance and force changes in Earth's climate. Greenhouse gases are one such mechanism. Greenhouse gases absorb and emit some of the outgoing energy radiated from Earth's surface, causing that heat to be retained in the lower atmosphere. As explained above, some greenhouse gases remain in the atmosphere for decades or even centuries such as Nitrous oxide and Fluorinated gases, and therefore can affect Earth's energy balance over a long period. Radiative forcing quantifies (in Watts per square meter) the effect of factors that influence Earth's energy balance; including changes in the concentrations of greenhouse gases. Positive radiative forcing leads to warming by increasing the net incoming energy, whereas negative radiative forcing leads to cooling.

The Annual Greenhouse Gas Index (AGGI) is defined by atmospheric scientists at NOAA as the ratio of total direct radiative forcing due to long-lived and well-mixed greenhouse gases for any year for which adequate global measurements exist, to that present in year 1990. These radiative forcing levels are relative to those present in year 1750 (i.e. prior to the start of the industrial era). 1990 is chosen because it is the baseline year for the Kyoto Protocol, and is the publication year of the first IPCC Scientific Assessment of Climate Change. As such, NOAA states that the AGGI "measures the commitment that (global) society has already made to living in a changing climate. It is based on the highest quality atmospheric observations from sites around the world. Its uncertainty is very low."

Global warming potential
The global warming potential (GWP) depends on both the efficiency of the molecule as a greenhouse gas and its atmospheric lifetime. Thus, if a gas has a high (positive) radiative forcing but also a short lifetime, it will have a large GWP on a 20-year scale but a small one on a 100-year scale. Conversely, if a molecule has a longer atmospheric lifetime than  its GWP will increase when the timescale is considered. Carbon dioxide is defined to have a GWP of 1 over all time periods.

Methane has an atmospheric lifetime of 12 ± 2 years. The 2021 IPCC report lists the GWP as 83 over a time scale of 20 years, 30 over 100 years and 10 over 500 years. The decrease in GWP at longer times is because methane decomposes to water and  through chemical reactions in the atmosphere.

The use of CFC-12 (except some essential uses) has been phased out due to its ozone depleting properties. The phasing-out of less active HCFC-compounds will be completed in 2030.

Concentrations in the atmosphere

Current concentrations 
Abbreviations used in the two tables below: ppm = parts-per-million; ppb = parts-per-billion; ppt = parts-per-trillion; W/m2 = watts per square meter

Measurements from ice cores over the past 800,000 years 
Ice cores provide evidence for greenhouse gas concentration variations over the past 800,000 years (see the following section). Both CO2 and  vary between glacial and interglacial phases, and concentrations of these gases correlate strongly with temperature. Direct data does not exist for periods earlier than those represented in the ice core record, a record that indicates CO2 mole fractions stayed within a range of 180 ppm to 280 ppm throughout the last 800,000 years, until the increase of the last 250 years. However, various proxies and modeling suggests larger variations in past epochs; 500 million years ago CO2 levels were likely 10 times higher than now. Indeed, higher CO2 concentrations are thought to have prevailed throughout most of the Phanerozoic Eon, with concentrations four to six times current concentrations during the Mesozoic era, and ten to fifteen times current concentrations during the early Palaeozoic era until the middle of the Devonian period, about 400 Ma. The spread of land plants is thought to have reduced CO2 concentrations during the late Devonian, and plant activities as both sources and sinks of CO2 have since been important in providing stabilizing feedbacks.
Earlier still, a 200-million year period of intermittent, widespread glaciation extending close to the equator (Snowball Earth) appears to have been ended suddenly, about 550 Ma, by a colossal volcanic outgassing that raised the  concentration of the atmosphere abruptly to 12%, about 350 times modern levels, causing extreme greenhouse conditions and carbonate deposition as limestone at the rate of about 1 mm per day. This episode marked the close of the Precambrian Eon, and was succeeded by the generally warmer conditions of the Phanerozoic, during which multicellular animal and plant life evolved. No volcanic carbon dioxide emission of comparable scale has occurred since.

Measurements from Antarctic ice cores
show that before industrial emissions started atmospheric CO2 mole fractions were about 280 parts per million (ppm), and stayed between 260 and 280 during the preceding ten thousand years. Carbon dioxide mole fractions in the atmosphere have gone up by approximately 35 percent since the 1900s, rising from 280 parts per million by volume to 387 parts per million in 2009. One study using evidence from stomata of fossilized leaves suggests greater variability, with carbon dioxide mole fractions above 300 ppm during the period seven to ten thousand years ago, though others have argued that these findings more likely reflect calibration or contamination problems rather than actual CO2 variability. Because of the way air is trapped in ice (pores in the ice close off slowly to form bubbles deep within the firn) and the time period represented in each ice sample analyzed, these figures represent averages of atmospheric concentrations of up to a few centuries rather than annual or decadal levels.

Changes since the Industrial Revolution

Since the beginning of the Industrial Revolution, the concentrations of many of the greenhouse gases have increased. For example, the mole fraction of carbon dioxide has increased from 280 ppm to 421 ppm, or 140 ppm over modern pre-industrial levels. The first 30 ppm increase took place in about 200 years, from the start of the Industrial Revolution to 1958; however the next 90 ppm increase took place within 56 years, from 1958 to 2014.

Recent data also shows that the concentration is increasing at a higher rate. In the 1960s, the average annual increase was only 37% of what it was in 2000 through 2007.

Many observations are available online in a variety of Atmospheric Chemistry Observational Databases.

Sources

Natural sources 
Most greenhouse gases have both natural and human-caused sources. An exception are purely human-produced synthetic halocarbons which have no natural sources. During the pre-industrial Holocene, concentrations of existing gases were roughly constant, because the large natural sources and sinks roughly balanced. In the industrial era, human activities have added greenhouse gases to the atmosphere, mainly through the burning of fossil fuels and clearing of forests.

Greenhouse gas emissions from human activities 

The agriculture, land uses, and other land uses sector, on average, accounted for 13-21% of global total anthropogenic greenhouse gas (GHG) emissions in the period 2010-2019.

Total cumulative emissions from 1870 to 2017 were 425±20  (1539 ) from fossil fuels and industry, and 180±60  (660 ) from land use change. Land-use change, such as deforestation, caused about 31% of cumulative emissions over 1870–2017, coal 32%, oil 25%, and gas 10%.

Today, the stock of carbon in the atmosphere increases by more than 3 million tons per annum (0.04%) compared with the existing stock. This increase is the result of human activities by burning fossil fuels, deforestation and forest degradation in tropical and boreal regions.

The other greenhouse gases produced from human activity show similar increases in both amount and rate of increase. 

The 2021 IPCC Sixth Assessment Report noted that "From a physical science perspective, limiting human-induced global warming to a specific level requires limiting cumulative CO2 emissions, reaching at least net zero CO2 emissions, along with strong reductions in other greenhouse gas emissions. Strong, rapid and sustained reductions in CH4 emissions would also limit the warming effect resulting from declining aerosol pollution and would improve air quality."

Removal from the atmosphere

Natural processes
Greenhouse gases can be removed from the atmosphere by various processes, as a consequence of:
 a physical change (condensation and precipitation remove water vapor from the atmosphere).
 a chemical reaction within the atmosphere. Other chemical reactions include solution and solid phase chemistry occurring in atmospheric aerosols.
 a physical exchange between the atmosphere and the other components of the planet. An example is the mixing of atmospheric gases into the oceans.
 a chemical change at the interface between the atmosphere and the other components of the planet.
 a photochemical change. Halocarbons are dissociated by UV light releasing Cl· and F· as free radicals in the stratosphere with harmful effects on ozone (halocarbons are generally too stable to disappear by chemical reaction in the atmosphere).

Negative emissions

A number of technologies remove greenhouse gases emissions from the atmosphere. Most widely analyzed are those that remove carbon dioxide from the atmosphere, either to geologic formations such as bio-energy with carbon capture and storage and carbon dioxide air capture, or to the soil as in the case with biochar. The IPCC has pointed out that many long-term climate scenario models require large-scale man-made negative emissions to avoid serious climate change.

History of scientific research

In the early 20th century, researchers realized that greenhouse gases in the atmosphere made Earth's overall temperature higher than it would be without them. During the late 20th century, a scientific consensus evolved that increasing concentrations of greenhouse gases in the atmosphere cause a substantial rise in global temperatures and changes to other parts of the climate system, with consequences for the environment and for human health.

See also

References

Further reading 

 



 

External links
 
 
 The official greenhouse gas emissions data of developed countries from the UNFCCC
 
 Annual Greenhouse Gas Index (AGGI) from NOAA
 Atmospheric spectra of GHGs and other trace gases

 
Articles containing video clips
Climate forcing